Wigan Borough F.C. was an English football club based in the town of Wigan. The club was founded in 1920 and joined the Lancashire Combination. In 1921, Borough turned professional when their application was accepted to play in the inaugural season of the newly formed Football League Third Division North.

Seasons

References

Seasons
Wigan Borough